Bolsón is a district of the Santa Cruz canton, in the Guanacaste province of Costa Rica.

Geography 
Bolsón has an area of  km2 and an elevation of  metres.

Villages
Administrative center of the district is the village of Bolsón.

Another village in the district is Lagartero.

Demographics 

For the 2011 census, Bolsón had a population of  inhabitants.

Transportation

Road transportation 
The district is covered by the following road routes:
 National Route 920

References 

Districts of Guanacaste Province
Populated places in Guanacaste Province